St Albans Cathedral Choir is an English Cathedral Choir based in St Albans, Hertfordshire, England. It is made up of around 20 boy choristers aged 7–14 and 12 adult lay clerks. In 2003 it appeared in the coronation scene of the film Johnny English.

In addition to the original boys-only choir, there is also St Albans Cathedral Girls' Choir (originally the Abbey Girls' Choir) founded in 1996.

Schedule
Unlike many cathedrals, St Albans does not have its own boarding choir school (although the Choir has strong links with many local day schools, including St Albans School and St Columba's College), meaning that services and rehearsals have to be fitted around a normal school week. Choristers are therefore expected to sing at the Cathedral both before and after school on Tuesdays and Thursdays, on which days Choral Evensong is sung, and before school on Mondays, in addition to an evening rehearsal with the Lay Clerks on Fridays and the commitment of up to four services over the weekend. A typical week will involve around 18 hours of singing, and over his seven-year career in the Choir a Chorister will spend approximately six months' worth of that singing in the Cathedral.

Touring
The Choir goes on tours to other countries every other year to perform concerts, with past tours including the United States, France, the Netherlands, Italy, Germany and, in 2017, Spain, during which it performed concerts in Segovia, Madrid and Alcalá de Henares, and sang at a service in the Church of San Andrés in Madrid.  In May 2019 it toured Italy, with performances given in Pesaro and Fano Cathedrals, the Church of San Paulo in Fano, and Mass at the Basilica di Loreto.

Traditions

The annual Choir Camp was founded by Peter Hurford when he was organist at St Albans and held in the hamlet of Luccombe. The tents used by the Choir remained the same since the first Choir Camp in 1958, with most being army surplus from the Second World War. On the Sunday the Choir would sing Choral Eucharist in St Mary's, Luccombe for the parishioners, and on each day the choristers and layclerks would go on hikes, often over ten miles in length, around the Somerset countryside. The Camp celebrated its 50th anniversary in 2008.

The Choir also holds an annual cricket match and football match using the grounds of local schools. The games are played between the two 'sides' of the Choir, known in the English choral tradition as Decani and Cantoris. Dec and Can have a close rivalry with Can winning football for the last 3 years and Dec winning Cricket for the last 3 years as well.

Organists
The Choir is directed by the Master of the Music, currently Andrew Lucas. The Assistant Master of the Music is currently Tom Winpenny. The current Organ Scholar is Dewi Rees.

Masters of the Music

1302 Adam
1498 Robert Fayrfax
1529 Henry Besteney
1820 Thomas Fowler
1831 Edwin Nicholls
1833 Thomas Fowler
1837 Thomas Brooks
1846 John Brooks
1855 William Simmons
1858 John Stocks Booth
1880 George Gaffe
1907 Willie Lewis Luttman
1930 Cuthbert E. Osmond
1937 Albert Charles Tysoe
1947 Meredith Davies
1951 Claude Peter Primrose Burton
1957 Peter Hurford
1978 Stephen Darlington
1985 Colin Walsh
1988 Barry Rose
1998 Andrew Lucas

Assistant Masters of the Music
The assistant master of music at St Albans may also be the Master of Music at St Albans School. For example, John Rutter's Donkey Carol is dedicated "to Simon Lindley and the choir of St. Albans School".

1908–09 John Cawley
1921–30 George C. Straker 
1936–39 Sydney John Barlow
1948–51 Frederick Carter
1951–70 John Henry Freeman
1970–75 Simon Lindley 
1975–76 John Clough
1976–2001 Andrew Parnell 
2001–08 Simon Johnson 
2008–current Tom Winpenny

Notable ex-choristers
  
 Rod Argent (born 1945) – pop musician, founding member of The Zombies and writer of international hits including "She's Not There", "Tell Her No" and "Time of the Season"
 Rogers Covey-Crump (born 1944) – tenor
 Mike Newell (born 1942) – film director
 Alfred Victor Smith VC Croix de Guerre (1891–1915) – recipient of both the Victoria Cross and the Croix de Guerre
 Julian Trevelyan (born 1998) – concert pianist

Trivia
St Albans Cathedral Choir appeared in the 2003 film Johnny English, starring Rowan Atkinson and John Malkovich, as the choir of Westminster Abbey during the coronation scene.

Performances
St Albans Cathedral Choir most notably hosts the Three Choirs Concert, a key part of the St Albans International Organ Festival. Since 2015, the Choir has accomplished three BBC Radio 3 broadcasts, and has performed in two BBC One television programmes. It has performed with several world-famous choirs, the most recent examples being the 2017 Three Choirs Concert, when it performed jointly with St Paul's Cathedral Choir and Temple Church Choir, and the 2019 Three Choirs Concert, with the Chapel Choir of Jesus College, Cambridge and the choirs of Salisbury Cathedral.

References

External links
 St Albans Cathedral Choir website

English choirs
Cathedral Choir
Boys' and men's choirs
Music in Hertfordshire